Andrej Barna (born 6 March 1998) is a Serbian swimmer. He is a member of the Hungarian community in Serbia.

He represented Serbia at the 2019 World Aquatics Championships held in Gwangju, South Korea and he finished in 44th place in the heats in the men's 50 metre freestyle event. He also competed in the men's 4 × 200 metre freestyle relay event.

In 2018, he won the gold medal in the men's 4 × 100 metre freestyle relay event at the Mediterranean Games in Tarragona, Spain.

References

External links
 
 

Living people
1998 births
Hungarians in Vojvodina
Place of birth missing (living people)
Serbian male freestyle swimmers
Mediterranean Games gold medalists for Serbia
Swimmers at the 2018 Mediterranean Games
Mediterranean Games medalists in swimming
Swimmers at the 2020 Summer Olympics
Olympic swimmers of Serbia